Heroiske is a village (selo) in Skadovsk Raion, Kherson Oblast, southern Ukraine.

Administrative status 
Until 18 July, 2020, Heroiske belonged to Hola Prystan Raion. The raion was abolished in July 2020 as part of the administrative reform of Ukraine, which reduced the number of raions of Kherson Oblast to five. The area of Hola Prystan Raion was merged into Skadovsk Raion.

Demographics 
According to the 1989 Soviet census, the population of the village was 643 people, of whom 328 were men and 315 women.

According to the 2001 Ukrainian census, 670 people lived in the village.

Languages 
According to the 2001 census, the primary languages of the inhabitants of the village were:

References 

Villages in Skadovsk Raion